The 2001 Virginia Tech Hokies football team represented the Virginia Polytechnic Institute and State University during the 2001 NCAA Division I-A football season. The team's head coach was Frank Beamer.

Schedule

Rankings

Roster

Games summaries

Miami (FL)

Gator Bowl

Team players in the NFL

References

Virginia Tech
Virginia Tech Hokies football seasons
Virginia Tech Hokies football